Vomo is an island within the Mamanuca Islands of Fiji in the South Pacific. It is located on the cusp of the Yasawa Islands.

Geography
Vomo is high volcanic triangular island with a beach along its western side. The island is a home of the private resort. The sister islet is Vomolailai or Little Vomo. Vomo is just a 15-minute helicopter ride from Nadi International Airport.

References

External links

Islands of Fiji
Mamanuca Islands